Traci Sorell is an American author of fiction and nonfiction works for teens and an enrolled member of the Cherokee Nation.

Personal life 
Sorell has spent her life with her family living on the Cherokee Nation tribe's reservation in northeastern Oklahoma by Fort Gibson Lake. Her mother's family has lived in the area since 1838 when Cherokee people were removed from their homelands. She has a younger brother and sister.

As a child, Sorell learned about her ancestors from her grandmother, fishing, and caring for animals and the land. She also enjoyed reading, singing, and performing in theater productions.

When Sorell was a teenager, she and her family moved to Southern California, and she became the first person in her family to graduate from college. Her mother, sister, and brother later received degrees, as well.

Sorell's second language is Spanish, though she is trying to learn the Cherokee language.

Education  
Sorell majored in Native American Studies and minored in Ethnic Studies at the University of California, Berkeley graduating with a Bachelor Arts in 1994. During her time at Berkeley, Sorell lived in Madrid and taught English and Spanish to children and adults.

In 1996, she received a Master of Arts from the University of Arizona, where she studied American Indian Studies with a concentration in Federal Indian Law & Policy.

Later, Sorell returned to school and received a Juris Doctor degree from the University of Wisconsin in 2001.

Career 
Sorell began her career by helping Native Nations and their citizens by writing "legal codes, testimony for Congressional hearings, federal budget requests, grants and reports."

Since beginning her writing career, Sorell has continued to focus on incorporating culturally accurate books about Cherokee and other Indigenous people for children and young adults.

Sorell is currently a Tulsa Artist Fellow.

Awards and honors 
Four of Sorell's books are Junior Library Guild selections: Powwow Day, We Are Still Here!, We Are Grateful: Otsaliheliga, and Classified.

Publications

Ages 4+ 

 We Are Grateful: Otsaliheliga, illustrated by Frané Lessac (2019)
 At the Mountain's Base / ᎾᏍᎩᏃ ᎤᎾᎢ ᎡᎳᏗᏢ ᎣᏓᎸᎢ, ᎾᎢ, illustrated by Weshoyot Alvitre (2019)
 Pow Wow Day, illustrated by Madelyn Goodnight (2022)
 Being Home, illustrated by Michaela Goade (2023)
 Clack, Clack! Smack! A Cherokee Stickball Story, illustrated by Joseph Erb (2024)

Ages 7+ 

 Classified: The Secret Career of Mary Golda Ross, Cherokee Aerospace Engineer, illustrated by Natasha Donovan (2021)
 One Land, Many Nations: Volume 1 with Lee Francis IV, illustrated by Jesse Hummingbird (2021)
 We Are Still Here! Native American Truths Everyone Should Know, illustrated by Frané Lessac (2021)

Middle grade 

 Indian No More with Charlene Willing McManis (2019)
 She Persisted: Wilma Mankiller with Chelsea Clinton, illustrated by Alexandra Boiger and Gillian Flint (2022)
 Contenders: Two Native Baseball Players, One World Series, illustrated by Arigon Starr (2023)
 Mascot with Charles Waters (2023)
 Riding the Trail: Cherokees Remember the Removal  with Will Chavez (2025)

Anthology contributions 

 Thanku: Poems of Gratitude, edited by Miranda  Paul, illustrated by Marlena Myles (2019)
 No Voice Too Small: Fourteen Young Americans Making History, edited by Lindsay H. Metcalf, Keila V.  Dawson, and Jeanette Bradley, illustrated by Jeanette Bradley (2020)
 The Reluctant Storyteller with Art Coulson, illustrated by Carlin Bear Don't Walk and Roy Boney Jr. (2020)
 The Talk: Conversations About Race, Love & Truth, edited by Wade Hudson and Cheryl Willis Hudson (2020)
 Ancestor Approved: Intertribal Stories for Kids, edited by Cynthia Leitich Smith (2021)
 Wonderful Women of the World, edited by Laurie Halse Anderson (2021)
 No World Too Big: Young People Fighting for Global Climate Change, edited by Lindsay H. Metcalf, Keila V.  Dawson, and Jeanette Bradley, illustrated by Jeanette Bradley (2023)

References

External links 

 Official website

Living people
Cherokee writers
21st-century American writers
21st-century American women writers
University of California, Berkeley alumni
University of Arizona alumni
University of Wisconsin alumni
English-language writers
Year of birth missing (living people)
American children's writers
American women children's writers